Paule Constable is a British lighting designer.  She won the 2005, 2006, 2009, 2013, 2020 Laurence Olivier Award for Best Lighting Design. She was also a nominee for four further productions and for a 2007 Tony Award on Broadway. In 2011 she won the Tony Award for Best Lighting Design of a play for War Horse.

Paule read English and Drama at Goldsmiths' College, London, and she trained in lighting design while working in the music business.

Her opera productions includes many designs for the Royal Opera, English National Opera, Glyndebourne, Opera North, Scottish Opera and Welsh National Opera. Abroad she has worked in Paris, Salzburg, Strasbourg, Berlin, Brussels, New Zealand, Dallas and Houston. For the Metropolitan Opera in New York she has designed lighting for Satyagraha, Anna Bolena, Don Giovanni, Giulio Cesare, The Marriage of Figaro, and others.

She has created fifteen productions at the National Theatre, including Paul. Her lighting designs are regularly seen at the Royal Shakespeare Company, the Donmar Warehouse, the Royal Court Theatre and with Théâtre de Complicité. In the West End she lit Evita, Don Carlos, The Weir and Amadeus (also Broadway, 1999 LA Critics' Award winner).

Theatre-dance productions in Britain and abroad include productions for Matthew Bourne, Will Tuckett and Adam Cooper.

Constable was the lighting designer for the 2010 25th Anniversary Touring Production of Les Misérables, staged at the Barbican Centre in London. A DVD of the live concert performance at the O2 on 3 October has been released. In 2011, this production performed at the Ahmanson Theatre and Constable won the L.A. Drama Critics Circle Award for Lighting Design.

Constable won Tony awards for her work on War Horse in 2011 and The Curious Incident of the Dog in the Night-Time in 2015.

References

External links
Meet Paule Constable, Stagework.org

Lighting designers
Laurence Olivier Award winners
Living people
Year of birth missing (living people)
Place of birth missing (living people)
Drama Desk Award winners
Helpmann Award winners
Tony Award winners
Alumni of Goldsmiths, University of London
People educated at Stamford High School, Lincolnshire